Gorgeous Lies is a 2002 novel written by Martha McPhee. It is a sequel to her first book, Bright Angel Time.

Synopsis 
This book tells the story of Anton Furey, a charismatic therapist who is dying. It details the familial relationships during this time, which includes his five kids, his wife's three kids and the child they have together. That child -- Alice -- then moves back to the farm where she was raised (Chardin). While the family lived there – in a communal lifestyle – they got the reputation of being the new American blended family. Because of that reporters and film crews took an interest, recording their lifestyle. 

Then things change. Anton gets sicker and many emotions from the years spent in Chardin surface. Throughout this process, the collective kids start reliving the issues they had, in an attempt to make their peace with their father.

Reception 
Publishers Weekly wrote that it has "an offbeat writing style and poetic metaphors", but not all of the characters "are fully sketched".  The Washington Post  Michael Harris of the Los Angeles Times wrote, "[McPhee] avoids the extremes of hippie nostalgia and conservative revisionism and doesn't provide any simple answers". Harris describes her prose as "elegant and airy".  Cathleen Medwick of O, The Oprah Magazine called it "an unusually strong novel [that] explores the wild frontier of domestic life." Bruce Bawer of The New York Times wrote, "If McPhee's first novel was a case of relatively orthodox storytelling, her second is a free-associative jumble of memory and emotion that makes the reader feel like a family therapist on marathon duty."  Kirkus Reviews wrote, "Somewhat rambling, but fine work nevertheless: a moving portrait of a foolish, foul-hearted, but impossibly innocent man."

References 

2002 American novels